David Leiser  (() born April 1, 1952) is an Israeli professor of psychology at Ben-Gurion University of the Negev, specializing in Economic psychology and Social psychology.   Leiser has served as President of the Economic Psychology division of the International Association of Applied Psychology (IAAP) since 2014.

He was president of the International Association for Research in Economic Psychology (IAREP) in 2011-2014.

Biography

David Leiser was born in Antwerp, Belgium. He earned his B.Sc in Mathematics at The Hebrew University of Jerusalem (1972), MSc in adult education at the University of Illinois at Urbana-Champaign (1973) and a doctorate in  psychology at the  Université de Genève (1978),  where he also served as Research Assistant to Jean Piaget.

Academic career
In 1979 Leiser joined the department of psychology of Ben-Gurion University, where he was appointed full professor in 2008.
 
He was the founder and director of the Inter-Faculty Center for Decision Making and Economic Psychology (2003-2013) at Ben Gurion University. He was chair of the steering committee of the Graduate Psychology Admission Exam at the National Institute for Testing and Evaluation (NITE) – Israel (2005-2017) .  He founded and directed the undergraduate psychology program of Ben-Gurion University at the Haredi College in Jerusalem

and serves as advisor to the Rector on academic outreach to the Haredi Community.   In 2014 he co-founded and served as deputy director of the Center for Research on Pension, Insurance and Financial Literacy, BGU.

In 2014-2015, he chaired the university committee for ethics in experiments on human subjects. Leiser served as Chair of the Department of Behavioral Sciences (1995-1997), of the Department of Psychology (2006-2008) and as Acting Chair of the department of inter-disciplinary Studies (2009-2010).

Leiser held Visiting Positions at the University of Chicago (1976-1977), MIT (1986-1987), Harvard and Yale (2007), Paris V (René Descartes) (1993-1994) and Paris II (Panthéon — Assas) (2017).

He was Associate Editor of the Journal of Economic Psychology.

He is conversant in eight languages: French, Hebrew, English, Flemish, Yiddish, German, Latin and Italian.

Published works

Books
How We Misunderstand Economics And Why It Matters: The Psychology of Bias, Distortion and Conspiracy, coauthored with Yhonatan Shemesh, was published by Routledge in 2018. The book explores why laypeople have difficulty comprehending economics, both micro and macro.  The authors point out specific challenges presented by economic reasoning (both micro and macro) including aggregation, the systemic approach, and equilibrium, and identify fundamental limitations of human cognition: short range and narrow scope.  When people try to interpret economic situations, most look for direct reasons and tend to overlook indirect causes and feedback effects. In addition, people suffer from the intentionality bias, whereby causes are attributed to willful actions and individuals  rather than factors at the aggregate level where most economic thinking takes place.

In consequence, proper understanding cannot be achieved without training. In everyday life, the public has access to tools that create a semblance of understanding, but it is mostly illusory. These include application of personality traits, relying on metaphors, embracing an ideology, and using the Good-Begets-Good heuristic,

whereby economic indicators judged to be good are lumped together with those that are bad. This causes most people to believe that inflation and unemployment co-vary.

Misunderstanding economics by the public has some economic consequences arising directly from their behavior, but the impact is mainly due to the superficial and populist policies they tend to support.

The authors argue that it is impossible to explain every policy decision to the public. They are skeptical about what financial and economic education can achieve. They recommend engaging the public and explaining policy choices that are intelligible whenever possible, and thereby acquire a measure of trust that can serve policymakers when factors are too complex for the layman to understand.

Cognitive Science and Genetic Epistemology - a Case Study of Understanding
Leiser wrote this book together with Christiane Gillièron, it was published in Plenum, 1990 and Springer, 2012. Foreword by Bärbel Inhelder.

This book addresses two profoundly different approaches to cognitive functioning: the structural approach of Jean Piaget that focuses on the construction and application of logico-mathematical structures to structure the world, and the information processing approach, which is predominant today and focuses on the successive mental actions applied when performing a particular task. 

Using the seriation task as a case study, the book analyzes the interplay of both aspects, the structural and the procedural. In particular, their analysis shows that, contrary to the classic claim by Piaget, transitivity is neither necessary nor sufficient to succeed in the seriation task

Selected articles
Leiser, D., Duani, N., & Wagner-Egger, P. (2017). The conspiratorial style in lay economic thinking. PLoS ONE, 12(3), e0171238. 
Leiser, D., Benita, R., & Bourgeois-Gironde, S. (2016). Differing conceptions of the causes of the economic crisis: Effects of culture, economic training, and personal impact. Journal of Economic Psychology, 53, 154-163. 
Kril, Z., Leiser, D., & Spivak, A. (2016). What Determines the Credibility of the Central Bank of Israel in the Public Eye? International Journal of Central Banking, 12(1), 67-94. 
Carmel, E., Carmel, D., Leiser, D., & Spivak, A. (2015). Facing a Biased Adviser While Choosing a Retirement Plan: *The Impact of Financial Literacy and Fair Disclosure. Journal of Consumer Affairs, 49(3), 576-595. 
Shalvi, S., & Leiser, D. (2013). Moral firmness. Journal of Economic Behavior & Organization. 93, 400-407.
Maor, O., & Leiser, D. (2013). Lay psychology of the hidden mental life: Attribution patterns of unconscious processes. Consciousness and Cognition, 22(2), 388-401.

Media appearances and interviews

Edited special issues
Leiser D., Roland-Lévy Ch. and Sevón G. (1991) Children's economic socialization [Special issue of the Journal of Economic Psychology].
Leiser, D. & Azar, O. (2008) Motivation and Affect in Decision Making [Special issue of the Journal of Economic Psychology].
Leiser, D. & Roetheli, T.F. (2010) The Financial Crisis.[Special issue of the Journal of Socio-Economics].

References

External links
David Leiser, at Ben-Gurion University
David Leiser site
How We Misunderstand Economics and Why It Matters, book site
David Leiser, at ResearchGate
David Leiser, at Google Scholar

1952 births
Living people
Israeli Jews
Israeli scientists
Academic staff of Ben-Gurion University of the Negev
University of Geneva alumni
Belgian emigrants to Israel
Israeli expatriates in Switzerland